The East Texas Yamboree, a four-day event held annually during the third weekend of October in Gilmer, Texas, celebrates the sweet potato (called a "yam" in the United States) as a former cash crop, drawing thousands of tourists to the city for the occasion each year. The event has been held in Gilmer since 1935. Festivities at the event include the Queen's Coronation  Pageant, a carnival held around the town square, two parades--the first being the school parade with floats built by the different Upshur County Schools and different East Texas marching school bands. There is a marching contest for the high school bands on Friday. School floats are also judged, and the floats that earn first, second and third places are in the Queen's Parade, which takes place on Saturday. Other activities include a barn dance and livestock shows for the area FFA participants. Gilmer, Texas is the County seat of Upshur County and during this one week, the population of Gilmer grows in size from 5,000 to over 100,000 people. There have only been two times that they have not held the East Texas Yamboree and that was during wartime during World War II and recently when the COVID-19 pandemic started.

History

To celebrate the Texas Centennial, counties around the state were tasked with having festivals. It was decided that Upshur County would celebrate the yam, once again thriving due to the recent lifting of a quarantine on the former cash crop. The quarantine had been put in place in the late 1920s as the result of a weevil infestation. The festival proved to be so popular that the committee decided it would take place yearly from then on. It was temporarily suspended in 1941 due to World War II, and resumed in 1945; besides 2020 caused by the COVID-19 pandemic, resuming in 2021.

Past Yam Queens and Presidents

See also
List of festivals in the United States
List of museums in East Texas

References

External links
 Official Yamboree site

Festivals in Texas